The World Figure Skating Championships is an annual figure skating competition sanctioned by the International Skating Union in which figure skaters compete for the title of World Champion.

The competitions took place from February 17 to 20 in Montreal, Quebec, Canada. These were the first figure skating world championships in Canada. It was the third year in a row that all competitions were held at the same location and at the same time. It was the first time that Japanese skaters participated.

Results

Men

Judges:
 Walter Jakobsson 
 Norman M. Scott 
 Hans Günauer 
 Yngvar Bryn 
 Georges Torchon 
 Herbert J. Clarke 
 J. B. Liberman

Ladies

Judges:
 J. B. Liberman 
 Hans Günauer 
 Georges Torchon 
 Walter Jakobsson 
 Yngvar Bryn 
 Herbert J. Clarke 
 Norman M. Scott

Pairs

Judges:
 Walter Jakobsson 
 Norman M. Scott 
 Hans Günauer 
 Yngvar Bryn 
 Georges Torchon 
 Eugen Minich 
 J. B. Liberman

Sources
 Result List provided by the ISU

World Figure Skating Championships
World Figure Skating Championships
World Figure Skating Championships
International figure skating competitions hosted by Canada
1932 in Canadian sports
1932 in Quebec
February 1932 sports events
March 1932 sports events
Sport in Quebec City